Flight data recorders (FDRs) and cockpit voice recorders (CVRs) in commercial aircraft continuously record information and can provide key evidence in determining the causes of an aircraft loss. Most flight recorders are equipped with underwater locator beacons to assist searchers in recovering them from offshore crash sites, however these beacons run off a battery and eventually stop transmitting. For various reasons, a flight recorder cannot always be recovered, and many recorders that are recovered are too damaged to provide any data.

See also 
List of missing ships

References

Recorders
Aircraft recorders
Aviation-related lists